The Deutsches Herzzentrum Berlin (DHZB) is a medical research centre in Berlin, Germany, specialised in cardiovascular disease, as well as cardiopulmonary transplantation.

The hospital has two CMR scanners. A new heart centre is planned to be built in 2018 and finish construction in 2021.

References 

Charité
Heart disease organizations
Medical research institutes in Germany
Medical and health organisations based in Berlin